The Canal du Faux-Rempart, also known as the Fossé du Faux-Rempart, is a canal in the centre of the city of Strasbourg in eastern France. The canal connects at both ends to the River Ill, thus surrounding the Grande Île that lies at the historic centre of the city.

The canal was originally an arm of the River Ill. Initially the bank on the inner, or city, side of the arm was fortified. In the thirteenth century a further wall was built along the middle of the channel. This fortified wall became known as the Faux Rempart or false rampart. Between 1831 and 1832, the mayor Frédéric de Turckheim removed the Faux Rempart in order to "allow a spacious navigation channel and freight transport within the city." In 1840, the canal was opened to navigation.

In its  length, the canal is crossed by 13 bridges, and passes through a single lock. Navigation is officially restricted to passenger trip boats only, which operate frequent circular cruises round the Grande Île and through the historic Petite France district of the city.

Gallery

See also

 List of canals in France

References

Faux
Canals opened in 1840
Geography of Strasbourg
CFaux-Rempart